Statistics of Swedish football Division 3 for the 1935–36 season.

League standings

Uppsvenska Östra 1935–36

Uppsvenska Västra 1935–36

Östsvenska 1935–36

Mellansvenska 1935–36

Nordvästra 1935–36

Södra Mellansvenska 1935–36

Sydöstra 1935–36

Västsvenska Norra 1935–36

Västsvenska Södra 1935–36

Sydsvenska 1935–36

Footnotes

References 

Swedish Football Division 3 seasons
3
Sweden